Teatro São Pedro  (in English: Saint Peter Theatre) is a theatre in São Paulo, Brazil.

References

External links
Official website (in Portuguese)

Theatres in São Paulo
Theatres completed in 1917
Tourist attractions in São Paulo